This is a list of the orders, medals and merit awards of Rwanda.

Republic of Rwanda 
The Republic of Rwanda's honours system consists of orders and medals awarded for exemplary service to the nation.

Obsolete Awards 
  National Order of the Thousand Hills

References

External links

 MOD website